María Amelia Belotti (born 17 November 1988) is an Argentine handball player. She plays for Vilo and the Argentina women's national handball team. She defended Argentina at the 2013 World Women's Handball Championship in Serbia.

References

External links 
 
 
 

Argentine female handball players
1988 births
Living people
Argentine people of Italian descent
Handball players at the 2016 Summer Olympics
Olympic handball players of Argentina
Pan American Games medalists in handball
Pan American Games silver medalists for Argentina
Handball players at the 2011 Pan American Games
Handball players at the 2015 Pan American Games
Medalists at the 2015 Pan American Games
Medalists at the 2011 Pan American Games
People from Lomas de Zamora
Sportspeople from Buenos Aires Province